Cuyamaca Rancho State Park is a state park in Southern California, United States, located  east of San Diego in the Cuyamaca and Laguna Mountains of the Peninsular Ranges. The park's  feature pine, fir, and oak forests, with meadows and streams that exist due to the relatively high elevation of the area compared to its surroundings. The park includes  Cuyamaca Peak, the second-highest point in San Diego County.

Park amenities include trails for hiking, horseback riding, and mountain biking, as well as campgrounds for family, group, equestrian, and primitive trail camping; and an exhibit at a former gold mine, the Stonewall Mine.

Wildlife in the area includes mountain lions, which have been known to attack humans, and park literature emphasizes avoiding encounters with them. Numerous other species of mammals, birds, reptiles, and amphibians are known to reside within the park.

The park was closed for several months due to massive damage incurred in the 2003 Cedar Fire. Although much of the forest was burned, the park has since been reopened. Native plants attuned to the fire ecology are re-growing and returning.

Geology 

Cuyamaca Rancho State Park is located in the Peninsular Range, which extends from the San Jacinto Mountains north of the park, southward to the tip of Baja California. At the western edge of the most seismically active area in North America, the range is a great uplifted plateau, cut off from the Colorado Desert to the east by the Elsinore Fault Zone, where vertical movement over the last two million years has amounted to thousands of feet of tectonic uplift.

Metamorphosed sediments such as schist, gneiss, and quartzite are abundant in the Cuyamacas, particularly in the Stonewall Mine area. Most of the rocks now seen in the park are plutonic: either the granodiorite comprising Stonewall Peak, or the gabbro comprising Cuyamaca Peak. As these bedrocks weather, they become the parent material of the coarse, acidic, red soil found throughout the area. Gabbro weathers to a darker red soil than granodiorite or other quartz-rich rock.

Gold is a natural element that appears around granite formations because gold forms during cooling and solidification of igneous rock. Gold commonly occurs in association with quartz, either as pure gold or as an ore. In the Cuyamaca area, gold is associated with the metasediment called Julian Schist. At mines in this area, including the Stonewall, veins of gold were followed into the bedrock and the surrounding ore was excavated. Most streams in the park have small amounts of gold, since it is constantly being removed from the quartz exposures by weathering.

Flora

Trees 

Cuyamaca's average elevation of nearly  enables many conifers and broadleaf trees to exist; a rarity in xeric Southern California. The conifers include the white fir, incense cedar, Coulter pine, Jeffrey pine, sugar pine and ponderosa pine. The broadleaves include the white alder, Arizona ash, California sycamore, Fremont cottonwood, coast live oak, canyon live oak, Engelmann oak, California black oak, interior live oak, oracle oak, and red willow.

Shrubs 

Wildflowers

Fauna 

Frequently seen mammals in Cuyamaca Rancho State Park include the southern mule deer, coyote, California ground squirrel, Merriam's chipmunk, black-tailed jackrabbit, brush rabbit, and Audubon's cottontail rabbit.  Cougars are present but rarely seen.

About 200 species of birds have been documented in the park.  Several of the most commonly seen bird residents and migrants are the wild turkey, acorn woodpecker, Nuttall's woodpecker, northern flicker, Steller's jay, western bluebird, white-breasted nuthatch, mountain chickadee, oak titmouse, American robin, red-tailed hawk, and red-shouldered hawk.  Migrants and summer residents include the black-headed grosbeak, Baltimore oriole, ash-throated flycatcher, western wood pewee, house wren, several warblers, and the lesser goldfinch.

Resident amphibians and reptiles include the canyon tree frog, Pacific tree frog, red-legged frog, western toad, common king snake, gopher snake, California mountain kingsnake, racer, striped racer, and western garter snake.

Cougar incidents 
Generally cougars are quite elusive, but for a ten-year span Cuyamaca Rancho State Park experienced a rash of incidents between visitors and cougars, including one human fatality.  Park users are warned not to hike, run, horseback ride or bike alone.

Cuyamaca Rancho's first reported cougar incident took place in June 1988. A European couple with a small child was chased by two cougars in the park's Green Valley Campground. A game warden investigated and killed the two male cats. The  juvenile female cat was located and shot.

1994 saw two separate incidents in which a cougar acted aggressively toward a party of three humans; officials located and shot both animals.  Then in December 56-year-old Iris Kenna was killed during an early morning solo hike by a  male cougar, which was located and destroyed that night.

A cub acting aggressively toward a woman on horseback was reported and killed in 1996. In 1998 a pair of hikers were menaced for 15 minutes before driving the cat off with pepper spray.  Two other aggressive cougar incidents were reported that year, both in the park's horse camp.

Fatal cougar attacks are extraordinarily rare.  In all of California since 1890 there have been 16 verified attacks on humans, only six leading to fatalities.  Leading cougar attack website CougarInfo.org has not listed any incidents at Cuyamaca Rancho since 1998.

Park history

Historical features in Cuyamaca Rancho State Park date from prehistoric humans through the Southern California Gold Rush.

Native Americans
Indigenous peoples in the area date back a minimum of 7000 years. Traces of their ancient and pre-contact civilizations are within the park, which is a Cuyamaca complex archeological site. Early bedrock mortars mark the sites of summer camps and villages. Even the name "Cuyamaca" is a Spanish version of the name the native Kumeyaay peoples used for this place. In water-short Southern California, the native Americans called the area Ah-Ha Kwe-Ah Mac, meaning "the place where it rains."

Kumeyaay peoples' traditional lands range from San Diego east through the Cuyamaca and the Laguna Mountains through present day Anza-Borrego Desert State Park to beyond the Salton Sea in the east, and south beyond present day Ensenada, Baja California on the Baja California Peninsula in Mexico. A typical band's typical range was a  radius from their winter home. Today twelve federally recognized Kumeyaay tribes are in San Diego County.

19th century
The park is located on the 1845 Rancho Cuyamaca Mexican land grant. With the discovery of gold in Julian in 1869, the Spanish, Mexican, and American governments and settlers changed the Kumeyaay's way of life forever. Disease spread through the Kumeyaay, traditional ways of life were destroyed, and promises broken as the Indians were expelled in 1875 from ancestral lands and taxed without representation.

The Stonewall Mine opened in 1870 and started the boomtown of Cuyamaca City. Peak production at the mine occurred between 1886 and 1891 while employing over 200 workers. In 1889 Cuyamaca Dam was completed and in 1892 Stonewall Mine was permanently sealed after large losses.

20th century
In 1923 Ralph Dyar bought the Cuyamaca Rancho and built a summer home. In 1933 he sold his property to the state, thereby creating Cuyamaca Rancho State Park.

Cuyamaca Rancho State Park Interpretive Association 

The Cuyamaca Rancho State Park Interpretive Association (CRSPIA) supports the mission of Cuyamaca Rancho and Palomar Mountain State Parks through education and interpretive activities that enhance the visitor's experience. CRSPIA accomplishes its goals principally through fundraising and supporting interpretive programs. Support is also provided for the parks' volunteer groups, which include the Interpretive Assistance Unit, the Mounted Assistance Unit, the Mountain Bike Assistance Unit, and the Trails Maintenance Unit.

Historically CRSPIA has passed along to park programs more than 95% of all funds received from the public. Sources of funds include profits from the operation of a gift shop and bookstore, sale of firewood, membership dues, and various fundraising events. Over the last decade, revenues have grown steadily to the current level of approximately $40,000 per year. Members receive a monthly newspaper, The Stonewall Sentinel.

The extensive Cedar Fire of October 2003 in Cuyamaca Rancho State Park destroyed the park's museum, CRSPIA's gift shop, and bookstore along with the entire inventory.  However a temporary facility has been constructed to house operations and provides these services once again to park visitors.

See also
Cuyamaca Outdoor School
List of California native plants
List of California state parks

References

External links 
California Department of Parks and Recreation: Official Cuyamaca Rancho State Park website
Cuyamaca Rancho State Park Interpretive Association

State parks of California
Parks in San Diego County, California
Cuyamaca Mountains
Campgrounds in California
Civilian Conservation Corps in California
East County (San Diego County)
History of San Diego County, California
Kumeyaay
 
Protected areas established in 1933
1933 establishments in California